Bo Knape (born 16 August 1949) is a Swedish sailor.  He won a silver medal in the Soling Class at the 1972 Summer Olympics.

References
 Profile at sports-reference.com

1949 births
Living people
Sportspeople from Gothenburg
Swedish male sailors (sport)
Olympic sailors of Sweden
Olympic silver medalists for Sweden
Olympic medalists in sailing
Sailors at the 1972 Summer Olympics – Soling

Medalists at the 1972 Summer Olympics
Place of birth missing (living people)